Thwaites Brewery is a regional brewery founded in 1807 by Daniel Thwaites in Blackburn, Lancashire, England, and now located near Mellor in the Ribble Valley. Part of the company's beer business was sold to Marston's in March 2015, and the original brewery facility was demolished in 2019.  Today, Thwaites still produces beer, but in much smaller quantities.

In 1999, the Mitchell brewery in Lancaster closed down and was bought in part by Thwaites. Lancaster Bomber, an English ale named in honor of the Avro Lancaster, has since been available from Thwaites public houses after being acquired in the takeover. Lancaster Bomber is now brewed by Marston's, as is Wainwright, the other Thwaite's beer.

The company has over 270 pubs, mainly in the North of England but reaching from the North Lakes area down to Solihull & Leicestershire.

The brewery invested heavily in pasteurized keg beers, especially those powered by nitrous in the 1990s. However, it is now working to increase the market for its cask beers. Thwaites unveiled a new craft brewery in December 2011 named "Crafty Dan".

History

Establishment 
Born in 1777, Daniel Thwaites first began brewing in Blackburn, Lancashire in 1807 when he joined the 'Eanam Brewery' in partnership with local businessmen, Edward Duckworth and William Clayton. At the age of 31, Daniel married Edward's daughter Betty, who later inherited her father's share of the company following his death in 1822.

The Brewery became the sole property of 'Thwaites' in 1824, when William Clayton sold his remaining share of the company to Daniel.

Daniel and Betty Thwaites went on to have twelve children - four sons and eight daughters. Daniel Thwaites Jnr was born in 1817, the sixth of their twelve children. Daniel Thwaites Jnr and his brothers John and Thomas later inherited the brewery following the death of their father, Daniel Thwaites Snr, in 1843.

The decade of the 1850s was one of growth for the brewery and increasing prosperity for the Thwaites partners. Thomas left the partnership and in 1858, following the earlier death of his mother and the retirement of his other brother, John, Daniel Thwaites Jnr became the sole owner of the brewery. One year later, he married Eliza Amelia Gregory and they had a son, Edward, who died in infancy and daughter, Elma Amy Thwaites.

The official announcement of the dissolution of the partnership published in the London Gazette on 25 February 1859 stated that it was by mutual consent.

Meanwhile, following the purchase of the Snig Brook Brewery in 1863, the brewery continued to prosper and develop in size. During this period, Eanam Brewery expanded production to provide 100,000 barrels a year by 1878. 
The business also had to adapt to various pieces of legislation, introduced by Gladstone's Liberal government. The 1869 Wine and Beer House Act gave licensing power back to the magistrates and was intended as a measure of control over the more unsavory beer shops. It was followed by the Intoxicating Liquor Licensing Act of 1872, which introduced higher license fees, licensing inspectors, reduced opening hours, restrictions on the sale of spirits to those 'apparently under the age of 16', and increased penalties for licensing offences.

Having become a wealthy man, Daniel Thwaites Jnr died in 1888, leaving his only daughter Elma Thwaites and her husband Robert Yerburgh to inherit the brewery.

Expansion into the 20th century 
By 1897, Thwaites was registered as a Limited company. Following this business expansion, Thwaites bought James Pickup Wines & Spirits Company and then Henry Shaw & Co, which owned the New Brewery in Salford. In 1925, Thwaites began bottling its beers and in 1927, purchased Fountain Free Brewery.

In 1946, Elma Yerburgh died, leaving colleague Albert Whittle to look after the brewery. The brewery continued to expand, purchasing the Bury Brewing Company in 1946 and the Preston Brewery Company in 1956. In 1966, the Eanam Brewery was extended and renamed Daniel Thwaites 'The Star Brewery'.

During the 1960s, Thwaites public houses were in abundance across the town and Daniel Thwaites' ales had become popular throughout East Lancashire. 1966 saw the opening of the new £5.5m Brewery and brewhouse, followed in 1972 by a new £3m bottling plant.

The 1970s and 1980s saw the purchase of Yates & Jackson of Lancaster.

Throughout this time, John Yerburgh, Elma Yerburgh's grandson, was the Brewery's chairman.

In 2002, John's wife, Mrs. Ann Yerburgh, became the Brewery chairman. John died in June 2014.

In 2017, Thwaites was granted planning permission to build a new brewery, stables and head office in Mellor, around 5 miles from its current location in Blackburn.

Shire horses 
The sound that was continuously heard in Blackburn throughout the 19th century was the clattering of horses hooves along the cobbled streets. The majority of these were work horses. Stable lads would lead the Thwaites horses out of the stables in Syke Street, across the road (until the end of the 19th century when the stables moved to the brewery site) and into the brewery yard where they waited patiently for their carts and drays to be loaded with the day's deliveries. These 'gentle giants' were to become a familiar sight in Blackburn for many years. In the 1920s however, most breweries decided to put their shire horses 'out to grass' and switch to motor transport. In 1927, the last of the Thwaites shire horses were led out of the brewery for the last time.

By the 1950s the shire horse had practically ceased to exist. But in 1957 an enterprising young manager called David Kay of Thwaites' soft drinks department wanted to bring the Shire dray horses back. Two years later, in 1959, he got his wish and was allowed to introduce two dray horses to the brewery's local route. He was convinced that the dray horses would not only attract good publicity for Thwaites but would be financially advantageous against the backdrop of rising fuel costs. On May Day in 1960 the first two shire horses were led out of the new Thwaites stables.

In 2016, Thwaites acquired a third horse that has been named Gunner to celebrate 13 Guns, a beer produced by the company.

Recent history 
2010 marked fifty years of the reintroduction of horse-drawn deliveries after they ended in the 1920s. To celebrate the anniversary, a commemorative sculpture featuring three of the Shire horses in a unicorn configuration was commissioned.

Thwaites started with ten public houses in 1807. Based at the Star Brewery in Blackburn, Thwaites now owns an estate of around 270 pubs, and a portfolio of inns and hotels and spas, which traded under the Shire Hotels banner until 2016 when they were brought under the Daniel Thwaites brand.

The family tradition continues to this present day. Ann Yerburgh is Chairman, son-in-law Richard Bailey is Chief Executive Officer and Arabella Yerburgh is a Non-Exec Director.

In 2011 Thwaites announced plans to build a new brewery.

At the end of 2011, Thwaites installed a new 200k craft brewery within the Star Brewery in Blackburn named 'Crafty Dan'. Featuring three new fermenters, Crafty Dan enables Thwaites to create up to three new beers a week as well as one off brews to mark special events. In 2016, as part of a drive to bring all parts of the business under a single brand, it was renamed Thwaites brewery.

In January 2012, Thwaites agreed to purchase the free trade interests of Hydes Brewery.

In January 2014, the company made national headlines. Thwaites' proposed closure of its Star Brewery and 60 brewing redundancies led to staff temporarily switching off the H, I and E in the company's brewery sign to spell "Twats". Thwaites' inability to select an alternative site for its brewery and to conclude a deal to sell its site to Sainsbury's received criticism in many areas including the local press and brewing industry. The Tandleman blog suggested that apart from the beers produced in the renowned Crafty Dan craft brewery, Thwaites would contract out production of its beers permanently to other breweries.

This proved prescient; the core beers were contracted out to Marston's and the latter company bought the top two (Wainwright's and Lancaster Bomber) and the bulk of Thwaites' beer business in March 2015 for £25.1m. Marstons will continue to supply Thwaites pubs with beer under a long-term contract whilst Thwaites will continue to produce (much reduced) volumes for its own pubs by retaining its microbrewery facility.

Cask ales 
Thwaites produce a wide range of cask ales including the core range and limited edition Signature Ale range which was launched in 2011. 2012 saw the introduction of the Quarterly Favorites range featuring the four most popular beers from the 2011 Signature Ale range.

In March 2015 Marston's bought all rights to Wainwright and Lancaster Bomber and a short-term license to use the Thwaite's brand.

 Owned by Marston's. Formerly sold under the Thwaites brand by Marstons but Thwaites branding discontinued 2016

Logo 
 

The Thwaites logo has undergone several changes since the brewery's foundation. The traditional logo was simplified to a gold and red emblem featuring shire horses on the top and remained in use until May 2011.
 
The newly adopted logo is based on vintage designs from the 19th century, but for the first time in the brewery's history, the famous shire horses which have been part of the emblem for almost 200 years have been dropped from its design.

References

External links
History of brewery

Companies based in Blackburn
History of Blackburn with Darwen
Breweries in England
British companies established in 1807
Food and drink companies established in 1807
1807 establishments in England